The women's 400 metre individual medley competition of the swimming events at the 2011 World Aquatics Championships was held on July 31 with the heats the final.

Records
Prior to the competition, the existing world and championship records were as follows.

Results

Heats
36 swimmers participated in 5 heats.

Final
The final was held at 19:19.

References

External links
2011 World Aquatics Championships: Women's 400 metre individual medley start list, from OmegaTiming.com; retrieved 2011-07-23.

Individual medley 400 metre, women's
World Aquatics Championships
2011 in women's swimming